Harry DeHaven House is a historic home located in East Fallowfield Township, Chester County, Pennsylvania. It was built about 1900, and is a two-story, five bay, frame dwelling in the Queen Anne style.  It features tall Jacobean chimneys, a wraparound porch on three sides, rounded corners, and a partial porch on the second story.  Its builder also built the Isaac Pawling House across the street.

It was added to the National Register of Historic Places in 1985.

References

Houses on the National Register of Historic Places in Pennsylvania
Queen Anne architecture in Pennsylvania
Houses completed in 1900
Houses in Chester County, Pennsylvania
National Register of Historic Places in Chester County, Pennsylvania